Arepyev is a rural locality (a khutor) in Tryokhlozhinskoye Rural Settlement, Alexeyevsky District, Volgograd Oblast, Russia. The population was 56 as of 2010.

Geography 
Arepyev is located 43 km southwest of Alexeyevskaya (the district's administrative centre) by road. Trekhlozhinsky is the nearest rural locality.

References 

Rural localities in Alexeyevsky District, Volgograd Oblast